The 1920 Abilene Christian Wildcats football team was an American football team that represented Abilene Christian College—now known as Abilene Christian University–as an independent during the 1920 college football season. Led by Sewell Jones in his first and only season as head coach, the team compiled a record of 4–0–1.

Schedule

References

Abilene Christian
Abilene Christian Wildcats football seasons
College football undefeated seasons
Abilene Christian Wildcats football